Aegean Archipelago Province may refer to
 Eyalet of the Archipelago, Ottoman Empire
 Vilayet of the Archipelago, Ottoman Empire